Cynthia Hesdra (1808-1879)  was born on March 6, 1808, in Tappan, New York, Rockland County to John and Jane Moore. Although Cynthia Hesdra spent a portion of her life as a slave, at the time of her death in 1879, she was quite wealthy. She operated businesses in Nyack, New York and in the city of New York. She also owned several properties in Nyack, New York City, and Bergen County, New Jersey. Her heirs, including her husband Edward, fought over her estate, in a series of precedent setting court cases.

Early life 
Cynthia Hesdra's father, John Moore, was well known in Rockland County. He too was one of the wealthiest men of his town. He owned and operated several businesses, including a mill in Sparkill, New York. The mill wheels he designed were said to have produced blankets for soldiers fighting in the American Civil War and used widely throughout Rockland County.

Very little is known about Cynthia Hesdra's mother, Jane. She may have been a slave which might explain how Cynthia Hesdra became enslaved. Cynthia eventually met and married a man by the name of Edward D. Hesdra. Edward Hesdra, a Hebrew mulatto, was the son of a white Virginia planter and a free black woman from Haiti. After their marriage, the couple purchased Cynthia's freedom. The two settled on Amity Street in New York City.

Cynthia operated a successful laundry business in New York City and she owned several properties there too. Eventually, she took her trade to Nyack, New York where she also accumulated property and operated her businesses. Among the many properties was a house that was part of the historic underground railroad in Nyack. A historical marker at Main Street and Route 9W now stands on the place where the historic house once stood.

On February 9, 1879, Cynthia D Hesdra died. The New York Times and other sources reported that she was worth more than $100,000 or more than $3 million in contemporary dollars. At first, there was no indication that Cynthia had a will. Her husband eventually produced a will that he alleged left everything to him. Cynthia D Hesdra's relatives argued that the will was fraudulent and that the signatures had been forged. The battle over Cynthia D Hesdra's fortune went to court. The dispute over her estate included the first application of a new law in New York State that allowed for comparisons between known and disputed signatures.

Trials after her death and legacy 
Many people testified during the trials, including several expert witnesses. Ultimately, the courts decided that Cynthia's will was legitimate and awarded the estate to her husband. Ironically, when Edward Hesdra died, there was a dispute concerning his will. Much of Cynthia D Hesdra's fortune was lost in all of the litigation and much of what was left went to several charities and to the state.

On Monday, May 18, 2015, the Toni Morrison Society's Bench by the Road project honored Cynthia D Hesdra in Nyack, New York with the dedication of a bench in Nyack's Memorial Park.  Toni Morrison was present for the dedication. The Nyack Bench is one of the first twenty benches dedicated by the Toni Morrison Society to honor the contributions of individuals and organizations of the African Diaspora in the U.S. and beyond.

Mori Latrice Book 
There is a book written by Lori L Martin, a sociology professor and Nyack native,  which describes the story of not only the Hesdra family, but also of Nyack and the surrounding area, their connection to the Underground railway and the court cases after the death of Ms. Hesdra and the management of her fortune. It is not only an account of the experience of this family, but of African Americans as a whole during the late 1700s to mid 1800s.

References

Further reading
 Martin, Lori Latrice. 2008.  The Ex-Slave's Fortune: The Story of Cynthia Hesdra.
 Snodgrass, Mary Ellen. 2007. The Underground Railroad: An Encyclopedia of People, Places and Operations. M.E. Sharpe.
 "Mrs. Hesdra's Will Properly Made." March 8, 1884. The New York Times.
 "For An Ex-Slave's Fortune." June 8, 1890. The New York Times.
Roberts, Karen. 2015. Toni Morrison Dedicates Bench to Former Slave. USA Today.  

1808 births
1879 deaths
People from Tappan, New York
19th-century American slaves
19th-century African-American women
19th-century American businesswomen
19th-century American businesspeople